These are the Billboard magazine Dance/Mix Show Airplay number-one hits of 2019.

See also
2019 in music
List of number-one dance singles of 2019 (U.S.)
List of number-one Billboard Dance/Electronic Songs

References

External links
Dance Airplay Chart (updated weekly)

2019
United States Dance Airplay